Presidents of the municipality of Ensenada in Baja California.

References